Wenkel is a German surname.  Notable people with the surname include:

Max Wenkel (1864–1943), German automobile pioneer and inventor
Ortrun Wenkel (born 1942), German operatic contralto

See also
Wankel
Wenzel

German-language surnames